Noha Nabil S Mohammad (born November 11, 1983) is a Kuwaiti social media influencer. In 2017 she was listed by Forbes among the Top 10 Most Influential Arab Women in Social Media.

Biography 
Nabil was born in the State of Kuwait. At the age of 9, she made her first media appearance as a presenter in the show Mama Anisa on Kuwait Television. In 2000 she was  nominated for the award for "Best Presenter of a Children's Program" at the Cairo International Film Festival.

Nabil earned a degree from Kuwait University in chemical engineering in 2005. In 2008 she moved to the United States, and in 2009 she launched a personal fashion and styling blog "See Fashion in My Eyes." In 2017, she received a gold medal from Snapchat as the first Arab on the platform.

Nabil appeared at Salalah Khareef Festival to read her poetry in 2003, and in 2015 she published a diwan (collection of poetry) titled "ملح الشعر (Salt of Poetry)". In this she included poems such as "أمانه يا حمد (Amana Ya Hamad)", "السكسوكه (Saksokeh)"  and "حلم الطفوله (Dream of childhood)".

Nabil  works with luxury brands for advertising and endorsements, including Bourjois, Swarovski, Messika Jewelry, Givenchy, Fendi, Armani and Versace.

Noha Nabil also founded her own Clothing brand, ELEVEN ELEVEN https://eleven11shop.com/ , Beauty brand Noha Nabil beauty  and her own perfume brand Retrouvailles 

In 2016 she was named "Most Influential Arab Figure" at a festival in Kuwait. In 2017 she was ranked fifth by Forbes in the list of "The Top 10 Most Influential Arab Women in Social Media" . In 2018 she was named Most Influential Figure in the Arab World at a Ramadan festival. In 2020, Vogue Business described her as "by far the biggest influencer in the Arabic Middle East".

References 

Social media influencers
1983 births
Living people
Kuwaiti television presenters
Kuwait University alumni